Ovunque sei is a 2004 Italian romance-drama film directed by Michele Placido.

It entered the competition at the 61st Venice International Film Festival, where it was booed by the audience and received bad reviews.  It won the Nastro d'Argento for best cinematography.

Cast 

 Stefano Accorsi: Matteo
 Barbora Bobulova: Emma
 Violante Placido: Elena
 Stefano Dionisi: Leonardo
 Giuditta Saltarini: Rita
 Massimo De Francovich: Carlo
 Donato Placido: Vincenzo 
 Valentina Lodovini: Francesca

See also 
 List of Italian films of 2004

References

External links

2004 films
Italian drama films
2000s Italian-language films
Films directed by Michele Placido
2000s Italian films